Arthur Leslie Norman English (9 May 1919 – 16 April 1995) was an English television, film and stage actor and comedian from the music hall tradition.

Early life

English was born at 22 Lysons Road in Aldershot, Hampshire, the son of Walter Frederick English (1856–1948) and Ethel English (née Parsons) (1886–1975), who married at Holy Trinity church in Aldershot in 1909. Arthur English had two older brothers: Walter (born 1910) and John Edgar (born 1912). All three boys were born in their parents' bedroom in Lysons Road and all three were baptised at Holy Trinity church. He attended West End Boys School in Aldershot (now the West End Centre) from the age of 5 to 14. His first stage appearance was aged 10 when he joined a group from Gale & Polden called the 'Five O'clock Follies' as an acrobat. On leaving school in 1933 he briefly worked at Fisher's Hotel in nearby Farnham before becoming an errand boy in a local grocery shop.

After serving in the British Army in World War II with the Hampshire Regiment and the Royal Armoured Corps, reaching the rank of sergeant, English worked as a painter and decorator in his native town and in the evenings worked as a semi-professional entertainer in various local venues polishing up his comedy routines. He married Ivy Ruth Martin in 1941; it was she who made his enormous kipper ties out of brightly coloured curtain material at the beginning of his stage career. They had two children, Ann Faith (1942–1999) and Anthony (born 1947).

In 1949, while still employed in Aldershot as a painter and decorator, English and his then stage partner Jonny Carrol unsuccessfully auditioned at the Windmill Theatre in London. On a second, and this time solo audition with Vivian Van Damm, English became resident comedian at the Windmill Theatre at the same time compering a show for Bob Potter. English stayed at the Windmill as the principal comic until August 1950.

His early professional career was as a stand-up comic in the persona of a stereotypical wartime "spiv", and he became known as "The Prince of the Wide Boys" dressed in a trilby hat, a white jacket and padded shoulders with a pencil-thin moustache set off with a flamboyant kipper tie four inches wide.

Acting career

His radio work began with the BBC series Variety Bandbox, using as always his own Aldershot accent but in the persona of a Cockney spiv. His usual delivery was to tell a long rambling shaggy dog story at ever-increasing rapidity without losing clarity until, at top speed, he would end with the catch-phrase: "Play the music! Open the cage!"  Another popular catch-phrase was "Mum. Mum. They're laughing at me!".

He began to appear on British television in mainly comedy roles in the 1970s, and is probably best remembered for playing the truculent and somewhat bolshy (though not entirely unsympathetic) maintenance man, Mr. Harman, in Are You Being Served? which he played from 1976 to 1985, including the 1977 film adaptation.  He played Arthur, Alf Garnett's mate, in In Sickness and in Health, a follow-up series to Till Death Us Do Part from 1985 to 1990. He also appeared in The Sweeney.

He had more likeable roles in two British children's TV series: The Ghosts of Motley Hall, which ran from 1976 to 1978 on ITV (produced by Granada Television), and as "Slugger" in Follyfoot, which ran from 1971 to 1973, also on ITV (produced by Yorkshire Television).  He was in several other films including For the Love of Ada (1972) as "Arthur" and Everyday Maths (1978), a British TV schools programme starring Jack Wild as English's grandson. In 1978 he was the subject in This Is Your Life, while in May 1983 he was a guest on Desert Island Discs with Roy Plomley. Also in 1983 he played Frosch in Die Fledermaus with English National Opera at the London Coliseum. In 1985 he appeared in an episode of the American TV series Magnum, P.I..

English appeared in the Royal Variety Performance in 1951 and 1980. He had been president of Aldershot Town F.C. which had been formed out of the ashes of Aldershot F.C. The new club badge depicted a rising phoenix and was designed by English. He had also been a long-standing member of the showbusiness charity the Grand Order of Water Rats, which he joined in 1970, a Freeman of the City of London and an Honorary Freeman of the Borough of Rushmoor.

Personal life

Following the death of his wife Ivy (1919–75), English began to drink. In 1977, English married a young dancer, Teresa Mann (born 1955), whom he met while they were performing in a pantomime together at Wimbledon, and in 1981, the couple had a daughter – Clare-Louise English, the partially deaf actress who runs the Hot Coals Theatre, which specialises in plays for the deaf. The performers John Inman and Jack Douglas were the child's godparents. The couple separated in 1986, and the marriage was dissolved in 1987. The last four years of his life were spent in Devereux House, a care home in Farnborough.

Arthur English died in 1995 at Frimley Park Hospital in Surrey as a result of complications from emphysema. After a funeral service at St Michael's church at which fellow Water Rat Jimmy Perry read the oration his body was cremated at the Park Crematorium in Aldershot where his ashes were later interred in a plot with those of his first wife.

Honours
An Aldershot Civic Society blue plaque was unveiled by actor and singer Jess Conrad OBE on 15 July 2017 at 22 Lysons Road where English was born in 1919.

Selected television appearances
 Comedy Playhouse (1967 & 1970) – Arthur Oakley / The Voice
 Dad's Army (1970) – the Policeman
 Doctor in the House (1970) – Vincent
 Bless This House (1971) – Traffic Warden
 Doctor at Large (1971) – Vincent
 ITV Playhouse (1972) – Tom
 Doctor in Charge (1972 & 1973) – Vincent
 Follyfoot (1971–1973) – Slugger
 Armchair Theatre (1973) – Carlyle
 Crown Court (1973, 1974, 1975 & 1977) – Billy Baker / Arthur Robins / Eddie Taylor / Mr. Sampson
 The Ghosts of Motley Hall (1976–1978) – Bodkin / 'Boddikins
 Are You Being Served? (1976–1985) – Mr. Beverley Harman
 Funny Man (1981) –  George Leslie
 Play for Today (1983) – Albert
 High & Dry (1987) – Fred Whattle
 In Sickness and in Health (1985–1990) – Arthur / the Man in Pub (final appearance)

Selected filmography
 Echo of Diana (1963) – Punter in betting shop
 The Hi-Jackers (1963) – Bert
 Percy (1971) – Pub Comic
 For the Love of Ada (1972) – Arthur
 Love Thy Neighbour (1973) – Carter
 Malachi's Cove (1973) – Jack Combes
 Barry McKenzie Holds His Own (1974) – Cockney Spiv
 Are You Being Served? (1977) – Mr. Harman
 The Boys in Blue (1982) – Farmer

References

External links

1919 births
1995 deaths
Actors from Aldershot
English male comedians
English male radio actors
English male television actors
English male film actors
British Army personnel of World War II
Deaths from emphysema
Male actors from Hampshire
20th-century English male actors
British male comedy actors
20th-century English comedians
Royal Hampshire Regiment soldiers
Royal Armoured Corps soldiers
Military personnel from Aldershot